Shower Shock is a bar of soap that has been infused with caffeine. The manufacturer ThinkGeek claims that when the soap is used, caffeine is exuded in the lather, to be absorbed through the user's skin. However, the idea that caffeine passes rapidly through the skin is unproven, and it has been suggested that the amount absorbed is not significant compared to a cup of coffee. Anecdotal accounts of using this soap also suggest that it is not effective as a delivery method for caffeine.

Showershock is peppermint scented glycerine soap that comes in a "normal" size, weighing 4 ounces (113 grams), estimated to provide 12 washes with 200 milligrams of caffeine per wash. The soap is also sold in a "Travel" size, estimated to provide 4.5 showers and 200 milligrams of caffeine per wash, weighing 1.5 ounces. In addition to the soap bars, there is also a Showershock Caffeinated showergel, with the same amount of caffeine per wash (if someone uses the "normal" amount of gel) with each bottle weighing 6.76 ounces.

The addition of peppermint oil to the body soap is widely considered to help to stimulate the user's senses to effect an alert state in the user, as caffeine's ability to meaningfully diffuse through human skin is extremely limited and, as a result, users will generally not receive a meaningful dose of the drug through the soap itself.

References

External links
Manufacturer's website

American brands
Soap brands
Caffeine